Ozarba is a genus of moths of the family Noctuidae. The genus was erected by Francis Walker in 1865.

Species
Ozarba abscissa (Walker, 1858) Kenya, Uganda, Malawi, Tanzania, Mozambique, Madagascar, Zambia, Zimbabwe, South Africa, Namibia, Gambia
Ozarba abscondita Hampson, 1918 Peru
Ozarba acantholipina Draudt, 1950 Yunnan
Ozarba accincta (Distant, 1898) Kenya, Tanzania, South Africa
Ozarba acclivis Felder & Rogenhofer, 1874
Ozarba adaptata Hacker, 2016 Yemen
Ozarba adducta Berio, 1940 Oman, Sudan, Ethiopia, Eritrea
Ozarba aeria (Grote, 1881) Wisconsin, Mexico
Ozarba africana Berio, 1940 Nigeria, Zaire, Rwanda, Tanzania, Zimbabwe
Ozarba agraria Schaus, 1911 Costa Rica
Ozarba alberti Wiltshire, 1994 Arabia, Ethiopia, Kenya
Ozarba albifascia (Walker, 1865) South Africa
Ozarba albimarginata (Hampson, 1895) India (Gujarat), Ethiopia, Somalia, South Africa
Ozarba albomediovittata Berio, 1937 Ethiopia, Somalia, Kenya, Tanzania, South Africa
Ozarba aldabrae Berio, 1959 Seychelles
Ozarba algaini Wiltshire, 1983
Ozarba aloisiisabaudiae Berio, 1937 Somalia, Kenya, Tanzania
Ozarba amazonia (Warren, 1889) Brazil (Amazonas, São Paulo)
Ozarba angola Hacker, 2016 Angola
Ozarba angulilinea Schaus, 1914 French Guiana
Ozarba apicalis Hampson, 1910 Arabia, Ethiopia, Kenya, Tanzania, Zambia, South Africa
Ozarba argentofusca Hacker, 2016 Yemen, Ethiopia, Kenya, Namibia
Ozarba argyrogramma (Hampson, 1914) Burkina Faso, Guinea, Senegal, Gambia, Ghana, Nigeria, Congo, Zaire, Angola, Sudan, Ethiopia, Kenya, Malawi, Tanzania, South Africa, Namibia
Ozarba atribasalis (Hampson, 1896) Oman, Yemen
Ozarba atrifera Hampson, 1910
Ozarba atrisigna (Hampson, 1910) Ethiopia, Kenya, Tanzania, Namibia
Ozarba badia (Swinhoe, 1886) India (Madhya Pradesh)
Ozarba bascura Dyar, 1914 Brazil (São Paulo)
Ozarba berioi Hacker, 2016 Yemen, Ethiopia, Kenya, Tanzania
Ozarba besidia (H. Druce, 1898) Mexico
Ozarba bettina (H. Druce, 1898) Mexico
Ozarba bicolora (Bethune-Baker, 1911) Ethiopia, Kenya, Uganda, Tanzania
Ozarba bicoloria Gaede, 1915 Namibia, South Africa
Ozarba bicornis Hampson, 1910 Paraguay
Ozarba binorbis Hampson, 1910
Ozarba bipars Hampson, 1891 India (Tamil Nadu)
Ozarba bipartita (Hampson, 1902) Angola, South Africa, Zimbabwe, Arabia, Ethiopia, Tanzania
Ozarba bisexualis Hampson, 1910
Ozarba boursini Berio, 1940
Ozarba brachycampta Hacker, 2016 Ethiopia, Tanzania
Ozarba brunnea (Leech, 1900) China
Ozarba capreolana Rebel, 1947 Egypt
Ozarba captata Berio, 1940 Eritrea
Ozarba catilina (H. Druce, 1889) Mexico
Ozarba catoxantha (Hampson, 1910) Botswana, South Africa, Namibia
Ozarba chionoperas Hampson, 1918
Ozarba choruba Dyar, 1914 Mexico
Ozarba chromatographa Hacker, 2016 Tanzania
Ozarba chrysaspis (Meyrick, 1891) Australia (Queensland)
Ozarba chryseiplaga Hampson, 1910
Ozarba cinda Schaus, 1940 Puerto Rico
Ozarba cinerea (Aurivillius, 1879) Namibia
Ozarba concolor Hampson, 1918 Peru
Ozarba consanguis (Hampson, 1902) Somalia, Ethiopia, Kenya, Tanzania, Botswana, Zambia, Zimbabwe, South Africa, Angola, Zaire
Ozarba consternans Hayes, 1975 Galápagos Islands
Ozarba contempta (Walker, 1858) South Africa
Ozarba corniculans (Wallengren, 1860) Ethiopia, Kenya, Rwanda, Tanzania, Botswana, Madagascar, Zambia, Zimbabwe, South Africa, Namibia
Ozarba corniculantis Berio, 1947 South Africa, Senegal
Ozarba costata Hampson, 1910 Argentina
Ozarba cryptica Berio, 1940 Eritrea, Ethiopia, Kenya, Tanzania, South Africa, Senegal, Ghana
Ozarba cryptochrysea Hampson, 1902
Ozarba cupreofascia Le Cerf, 1922
Ozarba cyanopasta Hampson, 1910
Ozarba damagarima Rothschild, 1921 Niger
Ozarba damarensis Berio, 1940 Namibia
Ozarba debrosi Wiltshire, 1983
Ozarba deficiens Berio, 1935 Somalia, Kenya
Ozarba delogramma Warren, 1913 Khasia Hills
Ozarba densa Walker, 1865
Ozarba devylderi Berio, 1940 Namibia
Ozarba diaphora Berio, 1937 Uganda, Ethiopia
Ozarba didymochra Hacker, 2016 Ethiopia
Ozarba dignata (Möschler, 1884) South Africa
Ozarba diplogramma Hacker, 2016 Nigeria, Zaire
Ozarba diplopodia Hacker, 2016 South Africa
Ozarba dissymetrica Hacker, 2016 Ethiopia, Tanzania
Ozarba divisa Gaede, 1916
Ozarba domina (Holland, 1894) Ivory Coast, Togo, Gabon, Nigeria, Cameroon, Congo, Zaire, Eritrea, Ethiopia, Kenya, Uganda, Malawi, Tanzania, Mozambique
Ozarba duosigna Hacker, 2016 Somalia
Ozarba duplovittata Hacker, 2016 Madagascar
Ozarba endoplaga Hampson, 1916 Somalia
Ozarba endoscota Hampson, 1916 Oman, Yemen, Ethiopia, Somalia, Kenya, Tanzania
Ozarba epimochla Bethune-Baker, 1911
Ozarba euthygramma Hacker, 2016 Burkina Faso, Ivory Coast
Ozarba euthygrapha (Hacker, 2016) Tanzania
Ozarba excisa Hampson, 1891 India (Tamil Nadu)
Ozarba excurvata Hampson, 1910 Argentina
Ozarba exolivacea Hampson, 1916
Ozarba exoplaga Berio, 1940 Cape Verde, Cameroon, Arabia, Sudan, Eritrea, Ethiopia, Kenya, Tanzania, Madagascar
Ozarba fasciata (Wallengren, 1860) South Africa
Ozarba felicia Le Cerf, 1922 Kenya
Ozarba ferruginata Hacker, 2016 Tanzania, Kenya, South Africa
Ozarba festiva Berio, 1950
Ozarba flavescens Hampson, 1910 Ethiopia, Kenya, Tanzania, Uganda, eastern Zaire
Ozarba flavicilia Hampson, 1914 Uganda
Ozarba flavidiscata Hampson, 1910 Madagascar
Ozarba flavipennis Hampson, 1910
Ozarba fuscescens Rebel, 1947 Egypt
Ozarba fuscogrisea Hacker, 2016 Namibia
Ozarba fuscopallida Hacker, 2016 Namibia
Ozarba fuscundosa Hacker, 2016 Ethiopia, Kenya, Zaire
Ozarba gaedei Berio, 1940 Namibia
Ozarba genuflexa (Hampson, 1902) South Africa, Namibia, Angola
Ozarba geta (H. Druce, 1889) Mexico
Ozarba glaucescens Hampson, 1910 India (Andhra Pradesh)
Ozarba gonatia Hacker, 2016 Namibia, South Africa
Ozarba grisescens (Berio, 1947) Ethiopia, Kenya
Ozarba griveaudae Viette, 1985 Madagascar
Ozarba heliastis Hampson, 1902
Ozarba hemichrysea Hampson, 1910
Ozarba hemileuca Wiltshire, 1982 Arabia, Ethiopia, Somalia, Kenya, Tanzania
Ozarba hemimelaena Hampson, 1910
Ozarba hemiochra Hampson, 1910 Oman, Zambia, South Africa, Namibia
Ozarba hemiphaea (Hampson, 1907) India (Andhra Pradesh), Sri Lanka
Ozarba hemipolia Hampson, 1910 Yemen, Ethiopia, Tanzania, South Africa, Namibia
Ozarba hemipyra Hampson, 1916
Ozarba hemisarca Hampson, 1916 Somalia, Namibia
Ozarba hemitecta Dyar, 1914 Venezuela
Ozarba heringi Berio, 1940
Ozarba hermanstaudei Hacker, 2016 South Africa
Ozarba hoffmanni Berio, 1940 Brazil (Santa Catarina)
Ozarba holophaea Hampson, 1910 Argentina
Ozarba honesta (Walker, 1865) southern India
Ozarba hypenoides (Butler, 1889) India (Himachal Pradesh, Sikkim)
Ozarba hypotaenia (Wallengren, 1860) Kenya, Tanzania, Eswatini, South Africa
Ozarba hypoxantha Wallengren, 1860
Ozarba illimitata Warren, 1914
Ozarba illosis (Hampson, 1907) Sri Lanka
Ozarba imperspicua Hacker & Saldaitis, 2016 Yemen, Oman
Ozarba implicata Berio, 1940
Ozarba implora Dyar, 1918 Mexico
Ozarba incondita Butler, 1889 Nepal, India (Himachal Pradesh)
Ozarba inobtrusa (Hampson, 1902) Ethiopia, South Africa
Ozarba inopinata Berio, 1940 Namibia
Ozarba insignis (Butler, 1884) Arabia, Ethiopia
Ozarba irrationalis Hacker, 2016 Namibia, Zimbabwe, Botswawa
Ozarba isocampta Hampson, 1910 Ethiopia, Kenya, Zimbabwe, Botswana, South Africa, Namibia
Ozarba itwarra Swinhoe, 1885 India (Maharashtra)
Ozarba jansei Berio, 1940 Ethiopia, Tanzania, Zimbabwe, South Africa, Namibia
Ozarba joergmuelleris Hacker, 2016 Angola
Ozarba kalaharis Hacker, 2016 South Africa, Namibia
Ozarba lamina (Swinhoe, 1901) Myanmar
Ozarba lascivalis Lederer, 1855
Ozarba lata Berio, 1977
Ozarba latizonata Hacker, 2016 Ethiopia, Kenya, Tanzania
Ozarba legrandi Berio, 1959 Kenya
Ozarba lepida Saalmüller, 1891 Eritrea, Ethiopia, Kenya, Malawi, Madagascar
Ozarba leptocyma Hampson, 1914 Senegal, Ghana, Nigeria, Sudan
Ozarba limbata (Butler, 1898) Oman, Yemen, Eritrea, Ethiopia, Somalia, Kenya, Tanzania
Ozarba limitata Berio, 1940 Sikkim
Ozarba madagascana Hacker, 2016 Madagascar
Ozarba madanda (Felder & Rogenhofer, 1874) South Africa
Ozarba magnofusca Hacker, 2016 Tanzania
Ozarba malaisei Berio, 1940 Namibia
Ozarba mallarba Swinhoe, 1885 India (Maharashtra)
Ozarba marabensis Wiltshire, 1980 Arabia, Ethiopia
Ozarba marthae Berio, 1940 Madagascar
Ozarba megaplaga Hampson, 1910 Kenya, Eritrea, Gambia
Ozarba melagona Hampson, 1910 Madagascar
Ozarba melanodonta Hampson, 1910 Trinidad
Ozarba melanographa (Hampson, 1916) Somalia
Ozarba melanomaura Hacker, 2016 Tanzania
Ozarba mesozonata Hampson, 1916 Arabia, Ethiopia, Somalia
Ozarba metachrysea Hampson, 1910
Ozarba metaleuca Hampson, 1910 Brazil (Amazonas)
Ozarba metallica (Hampson, 1896) Sri Lanka
Ozarba metaphora Hacker, 2016 Yemen
Ozarba miary Viette, 1985 Madagascar
Ozarba microcycla (Mabille, 1879) Madagascar
Ozarba micropunctata Berio, 1959 Madagascar
Ozarba moldavicola Herrich-Schäffer, [1851]
Ozarba molybdota Hampson, 1910 Sri Lanka
Ozarba morstatti Berio, 1938 Tanzania
Ozarba mortua Berio, 1940 Eritrea, Ethiopia, Uganda, Tanzania
Ozarba nairobiensis Berio, 1977 Kenya
Ozarba naumanni Hacker, 2016 Ethiopia
Ozarba nebula Barnes & McDunnough, 1918 Louisiana
Ozarba negrottoi Berio, 1940 Somalia, Tanzania
Ozarba nephroleuca Hampson, 1910 Madagascar
Ozarba nicotrai Berio, 1950 Somalia, Ethiopia, Kenya, Tanzania
Ozarba nigroviridis (Hampson, 1902) Eritrea, Ethiopia, Malawi, Tanzania, Mozambique, Botswana, Zambia, Zimbabwe, South Africa, Nambia
Ozarba nyanza (Felder & Rogenhofer, 1874) Arabia, Ethiopia, Kenya, Tanzania, South Africa, Namibia, Madagascar
Ozarba ochritincta Wileman & South, 1916 Taiwan
Ozarba ochrizona (Hampson, 1910) Arabia
Ozarba ochrozona Hampson, 1910 Ghana
Ozarba olimcorniculans Berio, 1940 South Africa, Namibia
Ozarba onytes Schaus, 1914 French Guiana
Ozarba oplora Dyar, 1914 Panama
Ozarba orthochrysea Hacker, 2016 Tanzania
Ozarba orthogramma Hampson, 1914 Ghana, Niger, Nigeria, Cameroon, Sudan, Ethiopia
Ozarba orthozona (Hampson, 1902) South Africa
Ozarba ovata Berio, 1977 Zaire, Malawi, Tanzania
Ozarba oxycampta Hacker, 2016 Madagascar
Ozarba pallescens (Wiltshire, 1990) Arabia, Somalia, Kenya, Tanzania
Ozarba pallida Hampson, 1910 India (Gajarat)
Ozarba pallidicoloria Hacker, 2016 Namibia
Ozarba parafricana Hacker, 2016 Angola
Ozarba paraplaga Hacker, 2016 Ethiopia, Tanzania
Ozarba parvula Berio, 1940
Ozarba paulianae Viette, 1985
Ozarba peraffinis Strand, 1920 Taiwan
Ozarba permutata Hacker, 2016 Ethiopia, Nigeria
Ozarba perplexa Saalmüller, 1891
Ozarba perplexoides Hacker, 2016 Madagascar
Ozarba persinua Berio, 1940 Namibia
Ozarba pesinua Berio, 1940
Ozarba phaea (Hampson, 1902) South Africa, Namibia, Arabia, Ethiopia, Kenya, Tanzania
Ozarba phaeocroa Hampson, 1910 Zaire
Ozarba phaeomera (Hampson, 1910) Nigeria
Ozarba phlebitis Hampson, 1910 India (Uttar Pradesh), Pakistan, Oman, Cape Verde
Ozarba plagifera (Rebel, 1907) Arabia, Sokotra, Eritrea, Ethiopia, Kenya, Malawi, Tanzania, South Africa
Ozarba pluristriata Berio, 1937
Ozarba postrufoides (Poole, 1989) Madagascar
Ozarba prolai Berio, 1977
Ozarba propera (Grote, 1882) Arizona
Ozarba punctifascia Le Cerf, 1922 Kenya, Ethiopia
Ozarba punctigera Walker, 1865 Nepal, Australia (Queensland)
Ozarba punctithorax Berio, 1940
Ozarba rectifascia (Hampson, 1894) India (Maharashtra)
Ozarba rectificata Berio, 1950 India (Madhya Pradesh)
Ozarba reducta Berio, 1940 India (Karnataka)
Ozarba regia Warren, 1914 South Africa
Ozarba reussi Strand, 1911
Ozarba rosescens Hampson, 1910
Ozarba rougeoti Berio, 1984 Djibouti
Ozarba rubrivena Hampson, 1910 Cape Verde, Mali, Mauritania, Burkina Faso, Senegal, Togo, Gambia, Nigeria, Niger, Cameroon, Eritrea, Ethiopia, Kenya, Tanzania, Namibia
Ozarba rubrofusca (Berio, 1947) Ethiopia
Ozarba rufula Hampson, 1910 India (Gujarat), Ethiopia, Sudan
Ozarba sancta Staudinger, 1900
Ozarba schmiedelae Mey, 2011 South Africa, Namibia
Ozarba schreieri (Hacker & Fibiger, 2006) Yemen
Ozarba sciaphora Hampson, 1910 Mexico
Ozarba scoliocampta Hacker, 2016 Madagascar
Ozarba scorpio Berio, 1935
Ozarba semiluctuosa Berio, 1937 Eritrea, Ethiopia, Somalia, Kenya, Arabia
Ozarba semipotentia Dyar, 1914 Mexico
Ozarba semipurpurea (Hampson, 1902) Eritrea, Ethiopia, Kenya, Tanzania, Zimbabwe, South Africa, Zaire
Ozarba semirubra Hampson, 1910 India (Tamil Nadu)
Ozarba semitorrida Hampson, 1916
Ozarba separabilis Berio, 1940
Ozarba simplex (Rebel, 1907) Sokotra
Ozarba sinua Hampson, 1910 Eritrea, Ethiopia, Kenya, Angola, Namibia
Ozarba socotrana Hampson, 1910 Arabia, Egypt, Eritrea, Sokotra, Zaire, Tanzania, South Africa
Ozarba spectabilis Hacker, 2016 Kenya
Ozarba squamicornis Dyar, 1918 Mexico
Ozarba staudeana Hacker, 2016 South Africa
Ozarba stenocampta Hacker, 2016 Madagascar
Ozarba stenochra Hacker, 2016 Burkina Faseo, N.Nigeria, Kenya
Ozarba strigipennis (Hampson, 1916) Somalia
Ozarba subdentula Hampson, 1910 Sri Lanka
Ozarba subterminalis Hampson, 1910
Ozarba subtilimba Berio, 1963
Ozarba subtilis Berio, 1966
Ozarba subtusfimbriata Berio, 1940 South Africa
Ozarba tacana Berio, 1977 Mexico
Ozarba tamsina (Brandt, 1947) Iran, Pakistan, Arabia
Ozarba tenuis Hacker, 2016 Ethiopia
Ozarba terminipuncta (Hampson, 1899) Sokotra
Ozarba terribilis Berio, 1940 Eritrea, Ethiopia, Kenya, Tanzania
Ozarba tilora (Dyar, 1912) Mexico
Ozarba timida Berio, 1940
Ozarba topnaari Mey, 2011 Namibia
Ozarba toxographa Hacker, 2016 Kenya, Tanzania
Ozarba toxotis Hampson, 1910 Ethiopia, Malawi, Tanzania
Ozarba transversa (Moore, [1884]) Sri Lanka
Ozarba tricoloria Hacker & Saldaitis, 2016 Sokotra
Ozarba tricornis Berio, 1977 Belize
Ozarba tricuspis Hampson, 1910 Kenya
Ozarba uberosa (Swinhoe, 1885) India (Maharashtra)
Ozarba uhlenhuthi Hacker, 2016 Ethiopia
Ozarba umbrifera Hampson, 1910 India (Gujarat)
Ozarba unigena Hacker & Saldaitis, 2016 Sokotra
Ozarba varia Walker, 1865
Ozarba variabilis Berio, 1940 Egypt, Eritrea
Ozarba variegata Le Cerf, 1911 Kenya
Ozarba venata Butler, 1889 India (Hiamchal Pradesh)
Ozarba vicina (Schaus, 1904) Brazil (São Paulo)
Ozarba violascens (Hampson, 1910) Arabia, Eritrea, Kenya
Ozarba wolframmeyi Hacker, 2016 Namibia

References

Acontiinae